Londonderry Foyle Road railway station served Derry in Northern Ireland.

The Londonderry and Enniskillen Railway opened the station on 18 April 1850. It replaced Londonderry Cow Market railway station which had formed the temporary terminus of the railway since opening in 1847.

It closed on 15 February 1965.

It was entirely demolished soon afterwards. The site is now the headquarters of the Foyle Valley Railway.

Routes

Gallery

References

Disused railway stations in County Londonderry
Buildings and structures in Derry (city)
Railway stations opened in 1850
Railway stations closed in 1965

Railway stations in Northern Ireland opened in 1850